A bolide is normally taken to mean an exceptionally bright meteor, but the term is subject to more than one definition, according to context. It may refer to any large crater-forming body, or to one that explodes in the atmosphere. It can be a synonym for a fireball, sometimes specific to those with an apparent magnitude of −14 or brighter.

Definitions
The word bolide (from Italian via Latin) may refer to somewhat different phenomena depending on the context in which the word appears, and readers may need to make inferences to determine which meaning is intended in a particular publication.

One sense refers to an extremely bright meteor, especially one that explodes in the atmosphere. In astronomy, it refers to a fireball about as bright as the full moon, and it is generally considered a synonym for a fireball. In geology, a bolide is a very large impactor.

One definition describes a bolide as a fireball reaching an apparent magnitude of −14 or brightermore than twice as bright as the full moon. Another definition describes a bolide as any generic large crater-forming impacting body whose composition (for example, whether it is a rocky or metallic asteroid, or an icy comet) is unknown.

A superbolide is a bolide that reaches an apparent magnitude of −17 or brighter, which is roughly 100 times brighter than the full moon. Recent examples of superbolides include the Sutter's Mill meteorite in California and the Chelyabinsk meteor in Russia.

Astronomy 

The IAU has no official definition of "bolide", and generally considers the term synonymous with fireball, a brighter-than-usual meteor; however, the term generally applies to fireballs reaching an apparent magnitude −14 or brighter. Astronomers tend to use bolide to identify an exceptionally bright fireball, particularly one that explodes (sometimes called a detonating fireball). It may also be used to mean a fireball that is audible.

Superbolide 

Selected superbolide air bursts:
 Tunguska event (Russia, 1908)
 2009 Sulawesi superbolide (Indonesia, 2009)
 Chelyabinsk meteor (Russia, 2013)

Geology 
Geologists use the term bolide differently from astronomers. In geology, it indicates a very large impactor. For example, the Woods Hole Coastal and Marine Science Center of the USGS uses bolide for any large crater-forming impacting body whose origin and composition is unknown, as, for example, whether it was a stony or metallic asteroid, or a less dense, icy comet made of volatiles, such as water, ammonia, and methane. 

The most notable example is the bolide that caused the Chicxulub crater 66 million years ago. Scientific consensus agrees that this event directly led to the extinction of all non-avian dinosaurs, and it is evidenced by a thin layer of iridium found at that geological layer marking the K–Pg boundary.

Gallery

See also 

 Comet Shoemaker–Levy 9 § Impacts
 Earth-grazing fireball
 Meteor procession
 Tollmann's hypothetical bolide
 Impact event#Airbursts

References

External links 

 historic record of bolides that have been witnessed entering the Earth’s atmosphere around the world from 861 through 2012 (B612 Foundation)
 Bolide Events 1988–2017 neo.jpl.nasa.gov

Meteoroids
Planetary geology
Atmospheric entry
Articles containing video clips